Young Turks Club (영턱스클럽), also known as YTC, is a five-member Korean idol group that debuted in 1996. The group was produced by Lee Juno from Seo Taiji and Boys and had Lim Sung-eun, Song Jin-ah, Han Hyun-nam, Ji Joon-goo, and Choi Seung-min as its original members. As the word "turk" means "young dynamic person eager for change", their name Young Turks Club means "a group of active young people eager to change." On July 9, 1996, they made their debut stage on KMTV's  with "Peek", the song didn't achieve success and failed to gain interest from the general public. They quickly changed to "Affection" a week later and rose to stardom. Their song "Affection" was their first release to become widely popular in Korea.

The group won the new artist award at the Seoul Music Awards in 1996.

Members 
 Lim Sung-eun (임성은) (1996-1997)
 Song Jin-ah (송진아) (1996-2000)
 Han Hyun-nam (한현남) (1996-2012)
 Ji Joon-goo (지준구) (1996-1998, 2002-2004)
 Choi Seung-min (최승민) (1996-1998, 2002-2012)
 Park Sung-hyun (박성현) (1997-1998, 2002-2012)
 Kim Duk-hyun (김덕현) (1998)
 Nam Hyun-joon (남현준) (1998)
 Jeon Hyun-jung (전현정) (1998-2000)
 Lee Min-kyung (이민경) (2011-2012)

Discography

Studio albums

References

K-pop music groups
Musical groups established in 1996
1996 establishments in South Korea
Seoul Music Awards